Eugrapheus is a genus of longhorn beetles of the subfamily Lamiinae, containing the following species:

 Eugrapheus curtescapus Breuning, 1970
 Eugrapheus lineellus Fairmaire, 1896
 Eugrapheus longehamatus Fairmaire, 1897
 Eugrapheus perroti Breuning, 1957
 Eugrapheus spinipennis Breuning, 1970
 Eugrapheus vitticollis Breuning, 1957

References

Desmiphorini